Terry Fox (1958–1981) was a Canadian whose Marathon of Hope raised funds and awareness for cancer research. 

Terry Fox may also refer to:

Other people
Terry Fox (American football) (1918–1981), American football player
Terry Fox (baseball) (born 1935), Major League Baseball pitcher
Terry Fox (artist) (1943–2008), American video, conceptual, and performance artist

Places named after the Canadian hero

Mount Terry Fox, a peak in the Canadian Rockies
Mount Terry Fox Provincial Park, the surrounding provincial park
Terry Fox Field (SFU Stadium at Terry Fox Field) in Burnaby, British Columbia
Terry Fox Drive, Ottawa
Terry Fox Memorial and Lookout, a memorial and lookout in Thunder Bay, Ontario
Terry Fox Secondary School, Port Coquitlam, British Columbia
Terry Fox Stadium, Ottawa, Ontario
Terry Fox Stadium (Brampton), Brampton, Ontario
Terry Fox Station, a transitway stop in Ottawa
Terry Fox Theatre, Port Coquitlam, British Columbia

Things named after the Canadian hero

CCGS Terry Fox, a Canadian Coast Guard icebreaker
Terry Fox Hall of Fame
Terry Fox Laboratory, the research unit of the British Columbia Cancer Agency
Terry Fox Run, an annual charity event

Fox, Terry